The WTA 125 tournaments are the secondary professional tennis circuit tournaments organised by the Women's Tennis Association. The 2023 calendar consists of sixteen tournaments so far with more events yet to be announced.

Schedule

Statistical information 
These tables present the number of singles (S) and doubles (D) titles won by each player and each nation during the season.  The players/nations are sorted by: 1) total number of titles (a doubles title won by two players representing the same nation counts as only one win for the nation); 2) a singles > doubles hierarchy; 3) alphabetical order (by family names for players).

To avoid confusion and double counting, these tables should be updated only after an event is completed.

Titles won by player

Titles won by nation

Points distribution

See also 

2023 WTA Tour
2023 ITF Women's World Tennis Tour
2023 ATP Challenger Tour

Notes

References 

 
2023 in women's tennis
2023
Current tennis seasons